Hockey Asia Cup may refer to:
 Men's Hockey Asia Cup
 Men's Hockey Junior Asia Cup
 Women's Hockey Asia Cup
 Women's Hockey Junior Asia Cup